Carlos Eduardo Carvalho (born 26 March 1957), commonly known as Carlinhos, is a Brazilian water polo player. He competed in the men's tournament at the 1984 Summer Olympics.

References

External links
 

1957 births
Living people
Brazilian male water polo players
Olympic water polo players of Brazil
Water polo players at the 1984 Summer Olympics
Water polo players from Rio de Janeiro (city)
20th-century Brazilian people